"Hallelujah" was the winning song of the Eurovision Song Contest 1979, performed in Hebrew by Milk and Honey, including Gali Atari, for .

History
The song was originally submitted by the composer Kobi Oshrat for the national Israeli selection for the Eurovision Song Contest 1978, but was rejected as “the selection committee did not think ‘Hallelujah’ was strong enough.“ It was also rejected by song festivals in Chile and Japan. It was, however, accepted for the national Israeli selection for the 1979 contest, where it was intended to be performed by the band Hakol Over Habibi. Hakol Over Habibi, nevertheless, declined the opportunity to sing it because the lead singer Shlomit Aharon declared she did not want to go to Eurovision.

After Oshrat decided to withdraw the song because of Hakol Over Habibi’s refusal to perform the song, the national final producers wanted Gali Atari to perform the song instead. The group Milk and Honey was then formed especially for the national selection around Atari, giving her the company of the three male vocalists Shmulik Bilu, Reuven Gvirtz, and Yehuda Tamir, so that the group had the same number of singers and gender composition as Hakol Over Habibi. The song only narrowly won the national Israeli selection with 63 points, only two more points than "Ein li ish milvadi", performed by Tzvika Pick, later internationally known as the composer of 1998 Eurovision winning song Diva.

This was the fourth occasion on which the host country had won the contest (and  had achieved the feat before this) and there are two more such occasions to date ( winning once in Millstreet and once more in Dublin). Israel could neither host nor compete in the next contest, which was scheduled for the same day as Yom Hazikaron, Israel's Memorial Day: the festivities of the event would clash with the somber tone of the day, which is marked in Israel with memorial services, two minutes of silence, and large numbers of visitors at military and civilian cemeteries.

The song is regarded as a classic of the contest due to the unique performance, in which Atari and her backing singers entered the stage one by one, rather than all together. It has also become something of a modern Jewish standard, recognized by many North Americans who might have never even heard of Eurovision.

It was performed tenth on the night, following West Germany's Dschinghis Khan with "Dschinghis Khan" and preceding 's Anne-Marie David with "Je suis l'enfant soleil". At the close of voting, it had received 125 points, placing 1st in a field of 19. According to author and historian John Kennedy O'Connor in his book The Eurovision Song Contest – The Official History, as Spain had been leading on the penultimate round of voting, this was the first time the winning song had come from behind to clinch victory on the final vote. The Spanish jury's vote gave the contest to Israel.

Israel did not enter the 1980 contest, which would have been held in that country (it was in fact held in The Hague). It returned to the fold for the 1981 contest, where this song was succeeded as Israeli representative by Hakol Over Habibi with "Halayla".

The song was reprised three more times at later Eurovision events. The first was at the end of the Eurovision Song Contest 1999 by all the contestants as a tribute to the victims of the wars in the Balkans. The second was performed by Atari with participants of the 'Switch Song' interval act during the final of the Eurovision Song Contest 2019. The third reprise was during Eurovision: Europe Shine a Light when Atari performed it as a Zoom-style sing-along with finalists of Junior Songfestival 2018 and 2019.

To celebrate Israel's 70th year of independence, the Israeli Culture and Sports Ministry released an updated version of the song. The updated version was sung by Atari and pop superstar Eden Ben Zaken and was performed in Jerusalem at the official state ceremony. When approached to revive the song she won Eurovision with at the 2019 Eurovision Song Contest, she refused to sing with her former teammates, Milk and Honey members Reuven Gvirtz, Shmulik Bilu and Yehuda Tamir. Instead, she sang it with renowned former Eurovision participants Conchita Wurst, Måns Zelmerlöw, Eleni Foureira and Verka Serduchka.

Charts

Cover versions
The husband-and-wife singing duo of Steve Lawrence and Eydie Gorme released the song in early 1979 on Warner Brothers Records.  The song was a modest hit on the adult contemporary chart, and the couple also performed it on The Tonight Show Starring Johnny Carson.  They also recorded a live version which was released on Applause Records in 1982.

As a trio (featuring solo part performed by Czech actress Věra Galatíková), the song was presented on November 1, 1987, and with alternate lyrics by  during the pre-filmed live show Abeceda: G+L created by Česká televize.

There is also an undocumented Polish version by Eleni Tzoka, recorded under title "Alleluja miłość twa".

See also
Music of Israel
Culture of Israel

References

Bibliography

External links 
Lyrics of "Hallelujah" 
Lyrics of "Hallelujah" 

Eurovision songs of Israel
Eurovision songs of 1979
1979 songs
Hebrew-language songs
Irish Singles Chart number-one singles
Polydor Records singles
Number-one singles in Norway
Number-one singles in Sweden
Israeli songs
Eurovision Song Contest winning songs
Marika Gombitová songs